The men's middleweight was a weightlifting event held as part of the Weightlifting at the 1920 Summer Olympics programme. 1920 was the first time weightlifting was divided into weight categories. Middleweight was the median category, including weightlifters weighing up to 75 kilograms. A total of ten weightlifters from seven nations competed in the event, which was held on 30 August 1920.

Results

References

Sources
 
 

Weightlifting at the 1920 Summer Olympics